Calvert F. Spensley (January 2, 1846 – January 17, 1924) was a member of the Wisconsin State Senate.

Biography
Spensley was born on January 2, 1846, in Stockton-on-Tees, England, where his father worked as the world's first rail station agent. He moved to Shullsburg, Wisconsin in 1849 and to Mineral Point, Wisconsin in 1857. Later, he attended the Eastman Business College and Columbia Law School. During the American Civil War, Spensley served in the Union Army as a sergeant.

On October 13, 1869, Spensley married Clara J. Cobb. They had three children. Spensley died on January 17, 1924.

Political career
Spensley was a member of the Senate representing the 28th district from 1893 to 1896. Previously, he was Mayor of Mineral Point from 1877 to 1878 and Chairman of the Iowa County, Wisconsin Board of Supervisors from 1875 to 1876. He was a Republican.

References

External links

People from Stockton-on-Tees
English emigrants to the United States
People from Shullsburg, Wisconsin
People from Mineral Point, Wisconsin
Republican Party Wisconsin state senators
Mayors of places in Wisconsin
People of Wisconsin in the American Civil War
Union Army soldiers
Columbia Law School alumni
Eastman Business College alumni
1846 births
1924 deaths